The Legacy Museum: From Enslavement to Mass Incarceration is a museum in Montgomery, Alabama, that displays the history of slavery and racism in America. This includes the enslavement of African-Americans, racial lynchings, segregation, and racial bias.

Development
The museum, which opened on April 26, 2018, is founded by Montgomery's Equal Justice Initiative as a counterpart to the National Memorial to Peace and Justice, which is dedicated specifically to the memory of the victims of lynching. The development and construction of the museum and the nearby memorial cost an estimated $20 million raised from private donations and charitable foundations. Former Vice-President Al Gore spoke at the two-day opening summit meeting.

Exhibits
The memorial complex features artwork by Hank Willis Thomas, Glenn Ligon, Jacob Lawrence, Elizabeth Catlett, Titus Kaphar, and Sanford Biggers. One of its displays is a collection of soil from lynching sites across the United States. The exhibits in the 11,000-square-foot museum include oral history, archival materials, and interactive technology.

The museum's goal is to lead the visitor on the path from slavery to racial oppression in other forms, including terror lynching and mass incarceration of minorites. To illustrate the point of on-going oppression, the exhibits include photographs of African-Americans picking cotton; the photos could be easily mistaken as depicting the slavery period. In fact, they are of inmates from 1960s.  Unlike the Mississippi Civil Rights Museum, the Legacy Museum does not tell a comforting story of progress from oppression to civil rights reform, but of continually evolving ways of controlling black people.  In one telling exhibit, a panicked group of captured and chained Africans stand opposite a group of men, arms raised, at the moment of arrest.

The museum employs technology to dramatize the horror and terror of enslavement, lynchings, and legalized racial segregation in America. Visitors can hear, see, and be in close proximity to slave replicas, which model what it was like to be an imprisoned slave awaiting sale at the auction block. There are first person accounts of slavery and auctioning through narration and voice overs. In 2021, the museum moved to a new site that boasts 47,000 square feet and new exhibits including an art gallery.

Gallery

See also
List of museums focused on African Americans
Topography of Terror: museum in Berlin, Germany dedicated to the victims of the Nazi regime

References

Further reading

External links

Museums in Montgomery, Alabama
African-American museums in Alabama
2018 establishments in Alabama
Lynching memorials
Tourist attractions in Montgomery County, Alabama
Monuments and memorials to victims of slavery in the United States
Museums established in 2018
Civil rights movement museums